William or Bill Morrow may refer to:

Politics
William W. Morrow (1843–1929), Republican U.S. Representative from California, 1885–1891 and Federal judge
William Morrow (South Australian politician) (1872–1934), member of South Australian Legislative Council
Bill Morrow (Australian politician) (1891–1980), Labor Party Senator from Tasmania, 1947–1953
Bill Morrow (California politician) (born 1954), U.S. Republican politician from the state of California
Bill Morrow (Canadian politician) (fl. 2006)

Arts
W. C. Morrow (1854–1923), American writer
William Morrow (screenwriter) (1907–1971), comedic screenwriter

Sports
William M. Morrow (1866–1944), American football player and World War I army general
Bill Morrow (footballer) (1928–2002), Australian footballer for Melbourne
William Morrow (footballer) (1851–1922), Irish footballer

Religion
William Morrow (priest) (1869–1950), Anglican Provost of Chelmsford
William D. Morrow, General Superintendent of the Pentecostal Assemblies of Canada

Others
William Morrow (physician) (1903–1977), Australian physician and specialist in gastroenterology
William Morrow (publisher) (1873–1931), American publisher
William Morrow and Company, the publishing house he began, now an imprint of HarperCollins
Bill Morrow (executive) (born 1959), corporate CEO